Grace Goldsmith Wahba (born August 3, 1934) is an American statistician and now-retired I. J. Schoenberg-Hilldale Professor of Statistics at the University of Wisconsin–Madison. She is a pioneer in methods for smoothing noisy data. Best known for the development of generalized cross-validation and "Wahba's problem", she has developed methods with applications in demographic studies, machine learning, DNA microarrays, risk modeling, medical imaging, and climate prediction.

Biography
Grace Wahba had an interest in science from an early age, when she was in Junior High she was given a chemistry set. At this time she also interested in becoming an engineer.

Wahba studied at Cornell University for her undergraduate degree. When she was there women were severely restricted in their privileges, for example she was required to live in a dorm and had a curfew. She received her bachelor's degree from Cornell University in 1956 and a master's degree from the University of Maryland, College Park in 1962. She worked in industry for several years before receiving her doctorate from Stanford University in 1966 and settling in Madison in 1967.

She is the author of Spline Models for Observational Data. She retired in August 2018 from the University of Wisconsin-Madison.
Her life and career are discussed in a 2020 interview.

Honors and awards

Wahba was elected to the American Academy of Arts and Sciences in 1997 and to the National Academy of Sciences in 2000. She is also a fellow of several academic societies including the American Association for the Advancement of Science, the American Statistical Association, and the  Institute of Mathematical Statistics.

Over the years she has received a selection of notable awards in the statistics community:

 R. A. Fisher Lectureship, COPSS, August 2014
Gottfried E. Noether Senior Researcher Award, Joint Statistics Meetings, August 2009
 Committee of Presidents of Statistical Societies Elizabeth Scott Award, 1996
 First Emanuel and Carol Parzen Prize for Statistical Innovation, 1994

She received honorary Doctor of Science degrees from the University of Chicago in 2007 and The Ohio State University in 2022. 

The Institute of Mathematical Statistics announced the IMS Grace Wahba Award and Lecture in 2021.

References

External links 

 Grace Wahba's University of Wisconsin website Home page

1934 births
Living people
American women statisticians
Fellows of the American Statistical Association
Members of the United States National Academy of Sciences
20th-century American mathematicians
21st-century  American mathematicians
Fellows of the Society for Industrial and Applied Mathematics
University of Wisconsin–Madison faculty
Cornell University alumni
University of Maryland, College Park alumni
Stanford University alumni
Bayesian statisticians
Fellows of the American Academy of Arts and Sciences
Fellows of the American Association for the Advancement of Science
Fellows of the Institute of Mathematical Statistics
Machine learning researchers
20th-century women mathematicians
21st-century women mathematicians
20th-century American women scientists
21st-century American women scientists
American statisticians
Mathematical statisticians